Senneterre is a parish municipality in northwestern Quebec, Canada, in the La Vallée-de-l'Or Regional County Municipality. The parish is mostly a rural municipality that almost completely surrounds the actual population centre of the neighbouring City of Senneterre.

The place is named after the geographic township of Senneterre, that in turn was named in honour of a captain of the Languedoc Regiment that fought under General Montcalm.

Demographics 

Population trend:
 Population in 2011: 1218 (2006 to 2011 population change: 2.7%)
 Population in 2006: 1186
 Population in 2001: 1192
 Population in 1996: 1169
 Population in 1991: 1082

Mother tongue:
 English as first language: 0.9%
 French as first language: 99.1%
 English and French as first language: 0%
 Other as first language: 0%

References

Parish municipalities in Quebec
Incorporated places in Abitibi-Témiscamingue